Frank Newman may refer to:
Frank Newman (footballer) (1898–1977), English footballer who played for Port Vale
Frank C. Newman (1917–1996), American law school dean, state supreme court judge, and scholar and reformer in international human rights law
Frank Newman (educator) (1927–2004), American education reformer and president of the University of Rhode Island
Frank N. Newman (born 1942), American banker and former United States Department of the Treasury official